David Arthur Hsieh (born August 1, 1953, in Hong Kong) is a professor of finance at the Duke University Fuqua School of Business. He has done extensive research on hedge funds and alternative beta, which includes dynamics of asset prices and their implications for financial risk management and risk and return in hedge funds and commodity funds.

Early life 
On August 1, 1953, Hsieh was born in Hong Kong. At 14, Hsieh immigrated from Hong Kong to the White Plains, New York, U.S. In 1972, Hsieh graduated from Phillips Academy, a university-prep school in Andover, Massachusetts cum laude.

Education 
In 1976 Hsieh graduated with a B.S. in Economics and Mathematics from Yale University with Summa Cum Laude.
Hsieh then spent a year working at the Federal Reserve Bank of New York before going to Massachusetts Institute of Technology for graduate school.
In 1981, Hsieh earned a Ph.D in Economics from Massachusetts Institute of Technology.

Career
In 1981, Hsieh's teaching career began as an assistant professor at the University of Chicago Graduate School of Business.

Hsieh is a professor at the Fuqua School of Business in Duke University in Durham, North Carolina.

Hsieh has multiple research papers on Hedge funds I professional journals. Hsieh has been an editor of professional journals such as Management Science, Economics Letters, Journal of Empirical Finance, and Journal of Business and Economic Statistics. He is a guest speaker at approximately 80 different occasions. Hsieh has authored or co-authored over 50 different papers or books.

Awards
In 2002 Hsieh was awarded the Bank of America Faculty Award.

Hsieh has received the CFA, Graham and Dodd Award of Excellence for the paper "Hedge Fund Benchmarks: A Risk-Based Approach", co-authored with William Fung and published in the Financial Analysts Journal in 2004; the Fischer Black Memorial Foundation and the 1999 Robert J. Schwartz Memorial Prize for the best paper on hedge funds.; the Smith Breeden First Prize for the best paper in the Journal of Finance for the article "Margin Regulation and Stock Market Volatility" joint with Merton H. Miller; and the Yale Science and Engineering Association High Scholarship Award, a college award for the highest class standing after 7 semesters.

References

External links
David Hsieh's Curriculum Vitae
"David A. Hsieh." Duke Faculty Profile. 2010. Retrieved Dec. 12, 2010.

Interviews
Plan Sponsor Magazine, Jul-Aug 1998, Q&A: Hedging for Diversification, by Gregory J. Millman.
Business Leader, January 2006, "Hedge Funds: Investing's Best Kept Secret," by Brad Wyckoff.
Barron's, March 27, 2006. "Anyone Here Seen Alpha?" by Jack Willoughby.

Living people
1953 births
Hong Kong emigrants to the United States
Duke University faculty
People from White Plains, New York
MIT School of Humanities, Arts, and Social Sciences alumni
Yale University alumni
University of Chicago faculty
American people of Chinese descent